Carlsburg might refer to:
Carlsburg, Schlei, a settlement at the Schlei river, Germany, at the site of ancient Gereby
Carlsburg, Weser, a former Swedish settlement at the Weser river, Germany, at the site of current Bremerhaven

See also
Carlsberg (disambiguation)
Carlsborg, Washington
Karlsborg
Karlsburg (disambiguation)